Ryazansky District is the name of several administrative and municipal districts in Russia:
Ryazansky District, Moscow, a district in South-Eastern Administrative Okrug of Moscow
Ryazansky District, Ryazan Oblast, an administrative and municipal district of Ryazan Oblast

See also
Ryazansky (disambiguation)

References